Phthalimide is the organic compound with the formula C6H4(CO)2NH. It is the imide derivative of phthalic anhydride.  It is a sublimable white solid that is slightly soluble in water but more so upon addition of base.  It is used as a precursor to other organic compounds as a masked source of ammonia.

Preparation 
Phthalimide can be prepared by heating phthalic anhydride with alcoholic ammonia giving 95–97% yield. Alternatively, it may be prepared by treating the anhydride with ammonium carbonate or urea.  It can also be produced by ammoxidation of o-xylene.

Uses 
Phthalimide is used as a precursor to anthranilic acid, a precursor to azo dyes and saccharin.

Alkyl phthalimides are useful precursors to amines in chemical synthesis, especially in peptide synthesis where they are used "to block both hydrogens and avoid racemization of the substrates". Alkyl halides can be converted to the N-alkylphthalimide:
 C6H4(CO)2NH  +  RX  +  NaOH   →   C6H4(CO)2NR  +  NaX  +  H2O
The amine is commonly liberated using hydrazine:
 C6H4(CO)2NR  +  N2H4   →   C6H4(CO)2N2H2  +  RNH2

Dimethylamine can also be used.

Some examples of phthalimide drugs include thalidomide, amphotalide, taltrimide, talmetoprim, and apremilast.  With a trichloromethylthio substituent, a phthalimide-derived fungicide is Folpet.

Reactivity 
It forms salts upon treatment with bases such as sodium hydroxide.  The high acidity of the imido N-H is the result of the pair of flanking electrophilic carbonyl groups. Potassium phthalimide, made by reacting phthalimide with potassium carbonate in water at 100 °C or with potassium hydroxide in absolute ethanol, is used in the Gabriel synthesis of primary amines, such as glycine.

Natural occurrence 
Kladnoite is a natural mineral analog of phthalimide. It is very rarely found among a few burning coal fire sites.

Safety

References

General reading